The Ultimax Man is a 1978 science fiction novel by Keith Laumer. An expansion of the short story "The Wonderful Secret", it was first published by St. Martin's Press.

Synopsis

Petty criminal Damocles Montgomerie is abducted by alien scientist Xorialle, who artificially increases his intelligence and gives him extra skills and abilities, in order to determine the bounds of human potential; however, Montgomerie soon goes far beyond Xorialle's expectations.

Reception

Critical reception of The Ultimax Man has been poor; Don D'Ammassa (who called it "trivial") and James Nicoll (who called it "sad", with a "pedestrian" first half and an "awful" second half) have both noted that Laumer had a stroke while writing the book.

Kirkus Reviews stated that Laumer "never finds the right tone or style", with the majority of the content taking place within "a fog of adolescent facetiousness", while John Clute, writing in The Encyclopedia of Science Fiction, declared that it was "significantly weak", relative to Laumer's earlier work.

References

1978 science fiction novels
American science fiction novels
Works by Keith Laumer
Alien abduction in novels
1978 American novels
St. Martin's Press books